Suite Sixteen is an album by vibraphonist Victor Feldman recorded in 1955 which was first released on the British Tempo Records and subsequently released on the Contemporary label in 1958.

Reception

The Allmusic review by Scott Yanow states: "The music is boppish with some surprises in the consistently swinging arrangements, giving one a definitive look at Victor Feldman near the beginning of his career".

Track listing
All compositions by Victor Feldman except as indicated
 "Cabaletto" - 2:53
 "Elegy" - 3:32
 "Suite Sixteen" (Tony Crombie) - 8:47
 "Sonar" (Kenny Clarke, Gerald Wiggins) - 6:40
 "Big Top" - 3:38
 "Duffle Coat" (Allan Ganley) - 5:19
 "Brawl for All" - 4:15
 "Sunshine on a Dull Day" (Eddie Carroll) - 5:48
 "Maenya" (Dizzy Reece) - 3:48 
Recorded in London, England on August 18, 1955 (tracks 4, 7 & 8), September 12, 1955 (track 3) and September 21, 1955 (tracks 1, 2, 5, 6 & 9)

Personnel
Victor Feldman - vibraphone, piano, drums, congas
Jimmy Deuchar (tracks 1, 2, 4, 5 & 7-9), Dizzy Reece (tracks 1, 2, 4, 5 & 7-9), Jimmy Watson (tracks 1, 2, 5 & 9) - trumpet
Ken Wray - trombone, bass trumpet (tracks 1, 2, 5 & 9)
John Burden - French horn (tracks 1, 2, 5 & 9)
Jimmy Powell  - tuba (tracks 1, 2, 5 & 9)
Derek Humble - alto saxophone  (tracks 1, 2, 4, 5 & 7-9)
Tubby Hayes, Ronnie Scott - tenor saxophone (tracks 1, 2, 5 & 9)
Harry Klein - baritone saxophone (tracks 1, 2, 5 & 9)
Tommy Pollard (tracks 3, 4, 7 & 8), Norman Stenfalt (tracks 1, 2, 5, 6 & 9) - piano
Lennie Bush (tracks 1, 2 & 4-9), Eric Peter (track 3) - bass
Tony Crombie (tracks 3, 4, 7 & 8), Phil Seamen (tracks 1, 2, 5, 6 & 9) - drums

References

Contemporary Records albums
Victor Feldman albums
1958 albums